Lyria cassidula is a species of sea snail, a marine gastropod mollusk in the family Volutidae, the volutes.

Subspecies
 Lyria cassidula cassidula (Reeve, 1849)
 Lyria cassidula pallidula Habe, 1962

Description

Distribution

References

External links
 Reeve, L. A. (1849). Monograph of the genus Voluta. In: Conchologia Iconica, or, illustrations of the shells of molluscous animals, vol. 6, pls 1-22 and unpaginated text. L. Reeve & Co., London.

Volutidae
Gastropods described in 1849